= ICMS Education System =

The ICMS Education System is a chain of schools and colleges in Khyber Pakhtunkhwa, Pakistan.

It was founded in 2005 by Tajamul Hayat. It operates more than 10 educational institutes in the province.

== Schooling system ==
ICMS has an extensive schooling system from nursery up to grade 12th. It has 50 branches including Peshawar city, Charsadda, Mardan, Chamkani, Hayathabade, Sadda District Kurram The institute stake holders are planning for expansion to other cities of Khyber Pakhtunkhwa.
